The Capela de Nossa Senhora da Saúde or the Chapel of Our Lady of Health, is a Roman Catholic chapel on the island of Chorão in Goa, India. It was originally built in 1705.

History 
Tradition has it that this chapel is the most antique monument in the island of Chorão and it was built at the expense of the Comunidade of Chorão.

The Chapel was re-built in 1940 and blessed on 24 April 1942. The original facade of the old chapel including the towers were left untouched. Jose Maria Tito Fernandes, the Architect who was mainly instrumental in rebuilding the Chapel and in putting up such a fine structure.

The Chapel has three altars. The main altar is dedicated to the patroness, Nossa Senhora da Saúde, and the lateral ones to St. Joseph and St. Sebastian.

The Chapel has the Stations of the Cross which have been canonically erected.

At the expense of Benedito Quadros a Grotto dedicated to Our Lady of Lourdes has been built in the compound of the Chapel. It was blessed on 27 April 1948.

See also 
 Our Lady of Grace Church (Chorão Island)
 St Bartholomew's Church (Chorão Island)
 Real Colégio de Educação de Chorão

References 

Roman Catholic chapels in Chorão Island
Portuguese colonial architecture in India
Roman Catholic chapels in India